Jake Peter Roche (born 16 September 1992) is an English singer and actor. He is known as the lead vocalist of the band Rixton (now known as Push Baby), charting at number 1 on the UK Singles Chart with "Me and My Broken Heart". In 2010, he appeared in the ITV soap opera Emmerdale, portraying the role of Isaac Nuttall.

Early life
Born in Reigate, England in 1992, Roche is the son of actor Shane Richie and his then wife, singer and television personality Coleen Nolan.  His parents divorced when he was nine years old. He has said about the divorce: "I remember seeing on the front pages about my dad cheating, but, as horrible as that was, we didn't fully understand because we were so young – so it’s not had this massive, damaging impact on us or anything."

He attended St Mary's Catholic College in Blackpool, prior to moving to London.

Career

Acting 
Roche trained at The Sylvia Young Theatre School for two years and appeared in the film Finding Neverland.

In 2010, he auditioned for the part of Isaac Nuttall in Emmerdale. Of the auditions he has said that he did not tell anyone who his parents were, Roche has said "I'd never go off mum and dad’s back because I wanted to know I could hold my own in a job like this." He was subsequently cast in the part and appeared on screens from August to October 2010.

He also appeared as Matt in the BBC musical film Rules of Love in 2010, and appeared briefly in drama Scott & Bailey in 2012.

In 2014, along with his band, he appeared on the Nickelodeon series The Haunted Hathaways as themselves.

Music 

Roche is the frontman for the band Push Baby, formerly Rixton, a pop and R&B group signed by Scooter Braun's SB Projects. The members of Push Baby are Roche on vocals and rhythm guitar and Charley Bagnall.

Rixton's first music video was released in October 2013 entitled "Make Out", an upbeat song that lampoons on famous music videos from Miley Cyrus, Katy Perry, Lady Gaga, Robin Thicke, Justin Bieber and Nicki Minaj, but it was never released as a single. Their first official single, "Me and My Broken Heart" is taken from their EP of the same name.

Personal life
Jake has an older brother. In 2014, Roche began dating Jesy Nelson from the girl group Little Mix. They became engaged in July 2015 but subsequently called off the engagement and ended their relationship in 2016.

Filmography

Discography

References

External links

1992 births
British male soap opera actors
British people of Irish descent
Living people
21st-century British singers
21st-century British male singers
Alumni of the Sylvia Young Theatre School